Jaroslava Severová (born April 1, 1942) is a Czech printmaker.

A native of Prague, Severová studied at the Academy of Fine Arts in that city from 1960 until 1966. From 1992 until 2007 she was on the architectural faculty of the Czech Technical University in Prague. She has taught at the University of Hradec Králové since 2005. Four of her prints are in the collection of the National Gallery of Art.

References

1942 births
Living people
Czech printmakers
Women printmakers
20th-century Czech artists
20th-century Czech printmakers
20th-century Czech women artists
21st-century Czech artists
21st-century printmakers
21st-century Czech women artists
Artists from Prague
Academy of Fine Arts, Prague alumni
Academic staff of Czech Technical University in Prague